Journeycake may refer to:

Johnnycake, a cornmeal flatbread also known as Journeycake
Johnnycake Town, a village in Maryland also known as Journeycake Town
Charles Journeycake